The Baghdad College of Fine Arts (now the Institute of Fine Arts) is a faculty of the University of Baghdad.

Background
Until the early 20th-century there was little development in the visual arts. However, in the 1930s and 40s, a group of talented local artists was sent to study in Europe by the Ministry of Culture. On their return, these artists introduced modern styles such as impressionism to the local scene. They shared their experiences and knowledge of art by opening studios, providing art tuition, organising artists' collectives and exhibitions. Most of these artists taught in the modern style. They also consciously searched for a visual language that would integrate contemporary abstract art with Iraqi traditions and themes. These artists formed the nucleus of the group that founded the College of Fine Arts and became its first Faculty members.

Origins
Its origins can be traced back to the Baghdad Conservatory founded in 1936. In 1940 the range of subjects studied was expanded to include acting, directing, painting and sculpture. In the same year, the name was changed to the Institute of Fine Arts. Then in 1958 it became the Academy of Fine Arts and premises were found in Bab Al-Moatham near the Medical City Teaching Hospital. There was an expansion of courses available with a Department of Film and Theatre, and  Department of Painting and Sculpture.

Brief timeline

 1936 The Conservatory established (precursor to the arts college)
 1938 The College of Fine Arts established  (with Faeq Hassan (1914-1992) as the Chair of the Department of Plastic Arts and Jawad Saleem  (1919–1961) as Chair of the Department of Sculpture)
 1940 Name changed to the Institute of Fine Arts (and offered programs in all aspects of the arts including acting, directing, painting and sculpture)
 1955 The Department of Pottery and Ceramics was added 
 1961 The Academy of Fine Arts was founded Khalid al-Jadir (1922-1988) as its first Dean. 
 1967 The Institute was formally attached to the University of Baghdad 
 1974 The Department of Graphic Art was established in 1974 with Rafa al-Nasiri (1940-2013) as its Dean

Notable alumni 

 Suhail Dabbach, actor

See also
 Iraqi art
 List of Iraqi artists

References

Iraqi art
University of Baghdad